Bhadradri Kothagudem district is a district in the eastern region of the Indian state of Telangana. The town of Kothagudem is the district headquarters..In terms of area, Bhadradri Kothagudem is the largest district with an area of 7,483 km2 (2,889 sq mi) in the state. The district shares boundaries with Khammam, Mahabubabad and Mulugu and with state boundary of Chhattisgarh and Andhra Pradesh.

The district comprises 24 mandals and 2 revenue divisions Kothagudem and Bhadrachalam. The district headquarters is located at Kothagudem town.

Kothagudem district boasts of some major industries. The district is endowed with a variety of important minerals such as Coal. The Singareni Collieries Company Limited (SCCL), a Government coal mining company jointly owned by the Government of Telangana and Government of India, has its headquarters in Kothagudem. SCCL is currently operating 16 opencast and 30 underground mines in 4 districts of Telangana with a manpower around 58,837. Kothagudem Thermal Power Station, which located in Paloncha is one of the coal based power plants of Telangana Power Generation Corporation Limited (TSGENCO), ITC- Paperboards and Specialty Papers Division (ITC-PSPD) which is amongst the leading names in the business worldwide is located at Sarapaka village near Bhadrachalam. Kothagudem district is also rich in forest reserves.

Geography 

The district is bounded on the north and north east by Bijapur and Sukma districts of Chhattisgarh state, on east by East Godavari district, on south and south east by Khammam district and West Godavari district, on west by Mahabubabad district and on north west by Mulugu district.

Demographics 
 Census of India, the district has a population of 1,069,261.

Administrative divisions 
The district has two revenue divisions of Bhadrachalam and Kothagudem and is sub-divided into 23 mandals. Anudeep Durishetty IAS is the present collector of the district.

Constituency 
Kothagudem district contains 5 constituencies.

1. Kothagudem Assembly constituency is a constituency of Telangana Legislative Assembly, India. It is one of constituencies in Kothagudem district. It includes the towns of Kothagudem and Palavancha and part of Khammam Lok Sabha constituency.

2. Aswaraopeta Assembly constituency is a ST reserved constituency of Telangana Legislative Assembly, India. It is one of 10 constituencies in Kothagudem district. It is part of Khammam Lok Sabha constituency.

3. Bhadrachalam Assembly constituency is a ST reserved constituency of Telangana Legislative Assembly, India. It includes the temple town of Bhadrachalam. It is one among 5 constituencies in Kothagudem district. It is part of Mahabubabad Lok Sabha constituency.

4. Yellandu Assembly constituency is a Scheduled Tribe reserved constituency of Telangana Legislative Assembly, India. It is one among 5 constituencies in Kothagudem district. It is part of Mahabubabad Lok Sabha constituency.

5. Pinapaka Assembly constituency is a ST reserved constituency of Telangana Legislative Assembly, India. It is one of 5 constituencies in Kothagudem district. It is part of Mahabubabad Lok Sabha constituency.

Mandals 

The below table categorizes mandals into their respective revenue divisions in the district:

See also 
 List of districts in Telangana

References

External links 

 Official website

Districts of Telangana